Mario Desiderio (born 1 February 1938) is a former Argentine footballer who has played in Argentina, Chile, Colombia and Italy as striker. He was part of Argentina's squad at the 1960 Summer Olympics.

Teams

 Estudiantes de La Plata 1954–1962
 Catania 1963
 O'Higgins 1964–1966
 Deportivo Cali 1967–1973

Honours
O'Higgins
Primera B de Chile: 1964

References

External links
 

1938 births
Living people
Argentine footballers
Argentine expatriate footballers
Estudiantes de La Plata footballers
Catania S.S.D. players
Deportivo Cali footballers
O'Higgins F.C. footballers
Chilean Primera División players
Primera B de Chile players
Argentine Primera División players
Serie A players
Categoría Primera A players
Expatriate footballers in Chile
Expatriate footballers in Italy
Expatriate footballers in Colombia
Association football forwards
Footballers from Buenos Aires